Jon Lyng (19 April 1945 – 16 February 2003) was a Norwegian lawyer and politician for the Conservative Party.

He was born in London as a son of John Lyng. A lawyer by profession, he is best known as the defender of Arne Treholt in 1984–1985, together with Andreas Arntzen and Ulf Underland. In politics, he was a State Secretary in the Ministry of Justice and the Police from 1985 to 1986. He was a member of Oslo city council from 1983 to 1991, and chaired his local party branch from 1992 to 1996. He was also chair of Oslo Kinematografer from 1988 to 1991 and 1996 to 2003.

References

1945 births
2003 deaths
Politicians from Oslo
Conservative Party (Norway) politicians
Norwegian state secretaries
20th-century Norwegian lawyers